GrayMatter Software is a data science, artificial intelligence, and analytics firm, headquartered in Bangalore, Karnataka. It was founded in 2006 by Vikas Gupta as a business intelligence consulting firm. Over the years, the company has partnered with SAP, Hitachi Vantara and Qlik for products and services within the airport Industry.

History
GrayMatter Software was founded in 2006 in Bangalore by Vikas Gupta and Charu Gupta. In the beginning, the company worked on the development of open source technologies to reduce the cost of business intelligence and analytics within Indian industries. In 2011, GrayMatter Software collaborated with SAP in the development process on HANA initiative. In late 2012, GrayMatter's pre-built analytic solution, Airport Analytics (AA+), was deployed on the SAP BusinessObjects platform at Indira Gandhi International Airport. Finance Analytics (FA+), Insurance Analytics (IA+) and Manufacturing Analytics (MA+) are other pre-built solutions developed by GrayMatter Software.

In 2014, Tekes, a public funding agency for research funding in Finland, invested 10 million Euros in GrayMatter. Later that year, company opened its global R&D center in Helsinki. In 2017, GrayMatter partnered with Hitachi Vantara. GrayMatter has been featured in NASSCOM, Helsinki Hub, SAP, Airport International, Airport Focus, and Silicon India.

The company's CEO, Vikas Gupta, has been also appointed as Regional Board Director of Airports Council International for Asia-Pacific.

References

2006 establishments in Karnataka